James Deuter (March 19, 1939 – August 29, 2010) was an American actor who appeared on film and television.  He is most known for playing Boswell on Early Edition.

Filmography

References

External links

2010 deaths
1939 births
Male actors from Chicago
American male film actors
American male television actors